Lü Gengsong (born. about 1957)
is a Chinese writer and civil rights activist.
He is mostly recognized as the author of the book Corrupted Officials in China,
which appeared in Hong Kong in 2000.
His work mostly reveals the corruptions of the Communist Party of China
and was imprisoned in 2008.

Arrest 

Lü was reportedly taken into custody on August 24, 2007,
on charges of "incitement to subvert state power" and "illegally possessing state secrets".
In February 2008, the Intermediate People's Court in Hangzhou announced the verdict over Lü to four years in jail.
The "inciting subversion of state power" is generally known to be a very vague charge frequently used to silence people who criticize the Communist Party.
Lu's wife, Wang Xue told AFP from her home in Hangzhou
that "The charges are groundless"
and that the "Provincial and city governments just want to make him shut up".

Corrupted officials of China 

 The book disclosed illegal eviction cases where provinces and city officials plotted schemes with real estate developers.
 Grafting - corruptions where the politicians make a profit off the public's money.

References 

5."HRIC Protests Detention of Writer Lü Gengsong" (August 27, 2007)

Living people
Year of birth missing (living people)